Miss Universe Russia 2006, was held on February 21, 2006, at Gostiny Dvor Arcade. 100 women competed at the pageant where Anna Litvinova won representing the Novokuznetsk. This contest was made specifically to send a candidate to the Miss Universe for that same year. Candidates from all the Russian regions and cities came to compete for the title. This was the last occasion on which the Miss Universe Russia organization sent a candidate.

Placement

Contestants

External links
 Miss Russia Official Website

Miss Russia
2006 beauty pageants
2006 in Russia